Lithuania was represented by 24 athletes at the 2012 European Athletics Championships held in Helsinki, Finland.

Medals

Participants

Results

Men

Track

Field

Women

Track

Field

Injuries 
 Rytis Sakalauskas injured himself after falling in semifinals of 100 m. He still showed up at the final, but after start he not started to run. Sakalauskas also withdrew from national 4x100 m relay team.
 Povilas Mykolaitis injured himself after first attempt in Long Jump qualifications.

Broadcasting
Eurosport

References 
 LLAF official website

Nations at the 2012 European Athletics Championships
2010
European Athletics Championships